In Greek mythology, Hyria (Ancient Greek: Ὑρίη) or Hyrie, also called Thyria or Thyrie was the Aetolian daughter of Amphinomus and mother, by Apollo, of Cycnus.

Mythology 
Hyrie grieved much for her son's death, not knowing he had been transformed into a swan; so she melted away in tears or, as others say, threw herself into a lake (Hyria) and was herself turned into a swan.

See also 

 Aedon
 Olenus
 Phene

Footnote

Notes

References 
 Antoninus Liberalis, The Metamorphoses of Antoninus Liberalis translated by Francis Celoria (Routledge 1992). Online version at the Topos Text Project.
 Publius Ovidius Naso, Metamorphoses translated by Brookes More (1859-1942). Boston, Cornhill Publishing Co. 1922. Online version at the Perseus Digital Library.
 Publius Ovidius Naso, Metamorphoses. Hugo Magnus. Gotha (Germany). Friedr. Andr. Perthes. 1892. Latin text available at the Perseus Digital Library.

Women of Apollo
Women in Greek mythology
Aetolian characters in Greek mythology
Aetolian mythology
Metamorphoses characters
Metamorphoses into birds in Greek mythology